Dutchman is a 1967 British drama film directed by Anthony Harvey and starring Shirley Knight and Al Freeman, Jr. It was based on the 1964 play Dutchman by Amiri Baraka (aka Le Roi Jones) who wrote the screenplay adaptation. John Barry wrote the score. The movie tells the story of a black man who meets a white woman while riding the subway in New York City.

Although not shown widely, the film was critically well-received and was nominated for the Golden Lion at the Venice Film Festival, where Shirley Knight received the Volpi Cup for best actress.

Bosley Crowther wrote a critical review of the film in the New York Times.

Cast
 Shirley Knight as Lula
 Al Freeman, Jr. as Clay

References

External links

Films directed by Anthony Harvey
1966 drama films
1966 films
Films scored by John Barry (composer)
British drama films
Two-handers
1966 directorial debut films
British films based on plays
1960s English-language films
1960s British films